Jamie Drummond (born November 7, 1971) is a Canadian sommelier, wine consultant, and writer who acts as Senior Editor and Director of Programs for Toronto not-for-profit Good Food Revolution.  Drummond was born in Edinburgh, Scotland, and is a former pupil of George Watson's College.  Following this Drummond went on to read Cultural Studies at the University of East London, UK.

Drummond began working as a sommelier for UK Chef Andrew Radford's Michelin Guide recognised Atrium restaurant in Edinburgh, Scotland. During this time he studied with the United Kingdom's Wine & Spirit Education Trust (WSET). In 1997 Drummond emigrated to Canada and began working as Sommelier at Toronto's Granite Club.  In 2004 he was hired by Jamie Kennedy and was in control of the selection and purchasing of wines for Kennedy's restaurants until late 2009.  For some time it was rumoured that he was the chef behind Charlie's Burgers in Toronto, which was not the case. Drummond has served as a wine judge for Intervin, BioVino, Ontario Wine Awards, Royal Agricultural Winter Fair. He also occasionally DJs in Toronto as DJ Non Doctor.

References

External links 
 Jamie Drummond's blog
 Drummond's contributions to GoodFoodRevolution.com

1971 births
Living people
Sommeliers
People educated at George Watson's College
Alumni of the University of East London
Scottish emigrants to Canada